The 27th Mountain Infantry Brigade is a mountain infantry formation of the French Army. The brigade is subordinated to the 1st Armored Division and specializes in mountain warfare.

History 
It is heir to the traditions of 
the 1st Alpine Division FFI, created in September 1944
renamed the 27th Alpine Division and finally 27th Alpine Infantry Division in December 1944
the 27th Alpine Brigade in December 1962
the 27th Alpine Division in August 1976
the 27th division d'infanterie de montagne (27th DIM) in July 1994.
With the end of conscription, all of the French Army's divisions were downsized and the 27th became a brigade in 1999.

After the liberation of the Combe de Savoie and the Grésivaudan, Colonel Jean Vallette d'Osia became the commander of the 1st Alpine Division of the French Forces of the Interior (1ere Division alpine FFI) in September 1944, which unified the mountain units created in the French Resistance in the northern Alps. The unit, the first FFI division, was formed at the suggestion of Colonel Marcel Descour, the FFI commander in Lyon, and approved by General Jean de Lattre de Tassigny. Vallette d'Osia located his headquarters in Challes-les-Eaux. Charles de Gaulle reformed the 27th Alpine Infantry Division on 17 November 1944 under the command of General Molle. The division, which became operational in January 1945, included the 5th Alpine Demi-Brigade (DBA) under the command of Lieutenant Colonel Le Ray and the 7th Alpine Demi-Brigade under the command of Colonel De Galbert. Its 159th Infantry Regiment was sent to defend Strasbourg in the same month and did not return to the Alps until March. While the 27th was reorganized, the Alpine valleys were held by the 4th Moroccan Mountain Division (4e DMM), which rejoined the 1st Army  on 17 November. The 4e DMM left behind its artillery, which was used to reform the 27th's 93rd Mountain Artillery Regiment (93e RAM).

After World War II 
From 4 September 1945 the division replaced the 4th Moroccan Mountain Division in occupying Austria, under command of General Béthouart. The French occupation zone there disappeared on 26 October 1955.

From 1954 to 1962, they served in Algeria, especially in the mountains of Kabylia, led  by General Faure. Some 1,000 Alpines were killed in Algeria.

In 1989 the division included the 27e Régiment de Commandement et de Soutien (27e RCS) at Grenoble; the :fr:4e régiment de chasseurs (4e RCh), Gap (36x Panhard ERC-90); the 6e Bataillon de Chasseurs Alpins (6e BCA), Varces-Allières-et-Risset; the 7e Bataillon de Chasseurs Alpins (7e BCA), Bourg-Saint-Maurice; the 11e Bataillon de Chasseurs Alpins (11e BCA), Barcelonnette; the 13e Bataillon de Chasseurs Alpins (13e BCA), Chambéry; the 27e Bataillon de Chasseurs Alpins (27e BCA), Annecy; the 159e Régiment d'Infanterie Alpine (159e RIA), Briançon; the 93e Régiment d'Artillerie de Montagne, Varces (24x towed M101), and the 7e Bataillon du Génie de division Alpine (7e BGDA), Avignon. 

Later, the "Alpins" of the 27th mountain infantry brigade intervened in Lebanon, Chad, Bosnia-Herzegovina, Ivory Coast and Afghanistan.
In 2016, the brigade was attached to the 1st Division.

Organisation 
The brigade is now organized as:

 Operational Control
 État-Major de Brigade (Brigade Staff), in Varces-Allières-et-Risset, and element at the Grenoble Mountain Troops Hotel
 4éme Régiment de Chasseurs à Cheval (4th Regiment of Mounted Chasseurs), in Gap (Light Tank and Light Mechanised)
 7éme Bataillon de Chasseurs Alpins (7th Battalion of Alpine Chasseurs), in Varces-Allières-et-Risset (Light Mechanised/High Mountain Armoured)
 2éme Régiment Étranger de Génie (2nd Foreign Engineer Regiment), in Saint-Christol  (Mountain Engineering)
 13éme Bataillon de Chasseurs Alpins (13th Battalion of Alpine Chasseurs), in Chambéry (Light Mechanised)
 27éme Bataillon de Chasseurs Alpins (27th Battalion of Alpine Chasseurs), in Annecy (Light Mechanised)
 93éme Régiment d'Artillerie de Montagne (93rd Mountain Artillery Regiment), in Varces-Allières-et-Risset (Mobile Artillery)
 27éme Compagnie de Commandement et de Transmissions de Montagne (27th Company of Command and of Communications of Mountain), in Varces-Allières-et-Risset

 Administrative Control
 Groupement de Commandos de Montagne (GCM, Group of Commandos of the Mountain), in Modane
 École Militaire de Haute Montagne (High Mountain Military School), in Chamonix Mont Blanc
 Centre de Formation Initiale Militaire — 6éme Bataillon de Chasseurs Alpins, in Gap

External links 
  Official page

References

Citations

Bibliography 

 

Brigades of France
Mountain infantry brigades
Military units and formations established in 1888